Korg or KORG may refer to:

 Korg, a Japanese electronic musical instruments maker
 Korg (character), a character in the Marvel Comics universe
 Orange County Airport (Texas), an airport with the ICAO code "KORG"
 Korg: 70,000 B.C., a 1974 TV series featuring Neanderthals
 KORG-LP, a low-power radio station (95.3 FM) licensed to serve Cleveland, Texas, United States